Damian Walshe-Howling (born 22 January 1971 in Melbourne, Victoria) is an Australian actor, well known for his role as Andrew "Benji" Veniamin in the Australian underworld drama, Underbelly, for which he won the Best Supporting or Guest Actor in a Drama Series at the 2008 AFI Awards.

Career
He also starred on Blue Heelers as Constable Adam Cooper from 1994 to 1998, and returned for the series finale in 2006. He has also had guest starring roles on Neighbours in 1993, The Secret Life of Us (2001) as Mac, Marshall Law (2002), Stingers (2003), Wilfred (2007), All Saints (2007) and Terra Nova (2011).

His film work includes Halifax f.p. (2000), He Died with a Felafel in His Hand (2001), Ned Kelly (2003) and Macbeth (2006).

In 2008, he hosted the Seven Network's factual series Crash Investigation Unit  and appeared in the Bell Shakespeare production of Pericles, Prince of Tyre. He also went back to his theatre roots with a B Sharp production of A View of Concrete.

In 2009, Walshe-Howling was nominated for Cleo Bachelor of the Year. He was set to star in Point Break 2, however due to the global financial crisis the movie did not go ahead. Walshe-Howling hosted Flickerfest 2009, then started filming The Reef with ex-Underbelly co-star Gyton Grantley. The movie was released in Australian cinemas in March 2011.

In 2010, Walshe-Howling hosted the Nine Network's reality show Customs; and in 2012, he appeared in Australian TV drama series, Bikie Wars: Brothers in Arms as Bandidos Vice President Mario "Chopper" Cianter, and also appeared in Play School. In 2013, he had a supporting role in Mystery Road and in 2014 he appeared in a supporting role in the ABC TV comedy drama series, Old School. He also had a supporting role as Owen Mitchell in all 24 episodes of the ABC's Janet King.

He is in the 2020 Australian sci-fi thriller 2067.

Filmography

Film
Actor

Other

Television

References

External links

 

1971 births
Living people
AACTA Award winners
Australian male film actors
Australian male television actors
Male actors from Melbourne
20th-century Australian male actors
21st-century Australian male actors